Hold on is the sixth and final album by the British hard rock band Trapeze.  The album was originally released in Germany in 1978 under the name Running with a different track order and album cover. This was the first and only studio Trapeze album to feature vocalist Pete Goalby, who later worked with Uriah Heep.

Track listing 
All songs written by Mel Galley, except where noted.

Side one
 "Don't Ask Me How I Know" (Pete Goalby) – 2:48
 "Take Good Care" – 3:34
 "When You Get to Heaven" (Goalby) – 4:08
 "Livin' on Love" (Goalby) – 3:47
 "Hold On" – 5:02

Side two
 "Don't Break My Heart" – 5:43
 "Running" – 4:27
 "You Are" – 4:45
 "Time Will Heal" – 6:37

Trapeze
 Pete Goalby – lead vocals, rhythm guitar
 Mel Galley – lead guitar, backing vocals
 Pete Wright – bass
 Dave Holland – drums, percussion
 Terry Rowley – keyboards, string arrangements

References

Trapeze (band) albums
1979 albums
Albums produced by Jimmy Miller
Warner Records albums